Spartak Subotica is the name of several sports clubs from Subotica, Serbia. It may refer to:

FK Spartak Subotica, a men's football club
HK Spartak Subotica, an ice hockey club
KK Spartak Subotica, a men's basketball club
, a men's volleyball club
RK Spartak Subotica, a men's handball club
VK Spartak Subotica, a water polo club
ŽFK Spartak Subotica, a women's football club
ŽKK Spartak Subotica, a women's basketball club